Jonathan Coy (born 24 April 1953, in Hammersmith, London) is a British actor. He has worked since 1975 largely in television, notably as Henry in the long-running legal series Rumpole of the Bailey and as Bracegirdle in the television series Hornblower, adapted from the books by C. S. Forester. He also appeared as the German character, Kurt, in the British television mini-series Brideshead Revisited, in Episode 7, entitled The Unseen Hook, and Colin Grove in The Sandbaggers in 1978.

In 2008 he played Lloyd in a UK tour of the play Noises Off, Leonato in the 2011 Wyndham's Theatre production of Much Ado About Nothing, with David Tennant, and Colonel Luykin in Pinero's The Magistrate at the Royal National Theatre in 2012-13, a production that was included in Season 4 of National Theatre Live.

In 1997 he appeared as Doug Arkwright in Hetty Wainthropp Investigates (“Daughter of the Regiment”, S3:E2).  He also played a German spy called "Hans Maier" in the BBC Series Foyle's War, Series 2 Episode 1; and played the Prince of Wales in the BBC series The Scarlet Pimpernel (1999). In 2003 he played Henry VIII in the Six Mothers-in-law of Henry VIII 'an unreliable history', on BBC Radio 4.

He appeared in the 2001 critically acclaimed television film Conspiracy as Erich Neumann, the Director of the Office of the Four Year Plan. His main scenes were with Brendan Coyle, who played Gestapo General Heinrich Muller. He would be reunited with Coyle over 10 years later on the set of Downton Abbey, where Coy played Mr George Murray, Lord Grantham's lawyer. Coy portrayed George Murray again in Downton Abbey: A New Era.

In 2014 he appeared in the world premiere production of Privacy at the Donmar Warehouse, London, and in 2015 in the world premiere production of Stoppard's The Hard Problem.

References

1953 births
Living people
English male television actors
English male stage actors